Paul Toussaint (27 November 1921 – February 2018) was a Belgian field hockey player. He competed in the men's tournament at the 1952 Summer Olympics.

References

External links
 

1921 births
2018 deaths
Belgian male field hockey players
Olympic field hockey players of Belgium
Field hockey players at the 1952 Summer Olympics
People from Ixelles
Field hockey players from Brussels